Oskari Vilho (1840–1883), was a Finnish stage actor. He was a founder of the first Finnish language theater in Finland, the Finnish National Theatre, in which he was an actor as well as  Kaarlo Bergbom's co-director when the company was founded in 1872.

References 

 Suomen kansallisbiografia 10, 

1840 births
1883 deaths
19th-century Finnish male actors